Agnès Marie Claire Nkada (born 12 March 1995) is a Cameroonian footballer who plays as a forward for Spanish Primera Nacional club Extremadura UD and the Cameroon women's national team.

Club career
Nkada joined Spanish Primera Nacional club Extremadura UD on 28 September 2019. In 2020, she joined PM Friol.

References

1995 births
Living people
Women's association football forwards
Cameroonian women's footballers
People from Centre Region (Cameroon)
Cameroon women's international footballers
African Games silver medalists for Cameroon
African Games medalists in football
Competitors at the 2015 African Games
FC Lorient players
Angers SCO players
Extremadura UD Femenino players
Cameroonian expatriate women's footballers
Cameroonian expatriate sportspeople in France
Expatriate women's footballers in France
Cameroonian expatriate sportspeople in Spain
Expatriate women's footballers in Spain